The Canal Saint-Martin is an 1872 painting by Alfred Sisley, now in the Musée d'Orsay, to which it was given in 1907 by Étienne Moreau-Nélaton. The artist was living near the Canal Saint-Martin and the painting formed part of a series of four works showing the canal - another was View of the Canal Saint-Martin. Sisley would have chosen the canal as the subject of a series of 4 canvases because it is an industrial infrastructure and it was close to it.

References

Paintings by Alfred Sisley
1872 paintings
Paintings in the collection of the Musée d'Orsay
Water in art